Leslie B. "Les" Otten (born 1949) is the former CEO of the American Skiing Company. Since resigning as its chief executive officer in 2001, Otten has been involved in numerous other businesses and industries, including the Major League Baseball's Boston Red Sox.

Early life and career
Otten was born in Teaneck, New Jersey, where he received his early education. He graduated high school from the Hun School of Princeton in Princeton, New Jersey, in 1967 and was named an Alumnus of the Year in 1999. Otten received a B.S. in Business Administration from Ithaca College in 1971, after which he worked for Killington and Sunday River ski resorts. In 1980, he purchased Sunday River, and his company, LBO Resort Enterprises, grew by acquiring Sugarbush, Attitash Bear Peak, and Cranmore in the Vermont-New Hampshire skiing areas.

Ski industry career
Otten started his career at Killington Ski Resort in Vermont in 1971. In 1973, at the age of 23, Otten was named ski operation manager of Sunday River in Newry, Maine. In 1980 Otten purchased Sunday River. In 1989, Otten was named Inc. Magazine Entrepreneur of the Year, Turnaround Category.

In 1995 he formed American Skiing Company by acquiring S-K-I, and this expanded his resorts to include Killington, Mount Snow, Haystack, Waterville Valley, and Sugarloaf/USA. He was forced to divest his interests in Waterville Valley and Cranmore but went on to buy Pico Peak in Vermont.

Under Otten, American Skiing Company invested heavily in marketing and infrastructure. While these investments are credited with major turnaround and growth, they overleveraged the company. A later bailout by an investment firm ultimately caused him to leave day-to-day operations while remaining on the Board of Directors. Otten resigned this position on February 26, 2007, effective immediately, to pursue other options. The Boston Globe reported, "I leave the board with mixed feelings," Otten said. "It's been a pleasure to serve and help guide the Company and I wish everyone well. I truly enjoyed my tenure with the board, but now it's time to look at other options."

In 2009, Otten was inducted into the Maine Ski Hall of Fame.

Boston Red Sox

From 2002 through 2007, Otten was vice chairman and minority partner of the Boston Red Sox American Major League Baseball franchise. In 2004, the Red Sox won their first World Series Championship since 1918 while Otten was part of the ownership group.

Maine Energy Systems
In 2008, Otten and two other partners started Maine Energy Systems, whose stated goal is to support a transition to the use of renewable energy for homes and businesses. The company originated from a series of informal seminars organized by Otten in 2007, where he assembled experts in various fields of energy to biweekly meetings. The meetings were broadly focused to allow for highly speculative thinking about Maine's economy and energy usage.

The group settled on a strategy that would involve the conversion of a significant proportion of the central home heating systems in Maine from oil to renewable fuel sources. The conversion to renewable fuels is expected to significantly cut long term heating costs in homes and businesses. The production of the fuel from Maine forests would also employ many Maine workers and keep the money spent on home heating in Maine.

To implement the solution, Otten, Dutch Dresser, and Bill Strauss formed Maine Energy Systems, LLC.

In January 2009, Maine Energy Systems was recognized by Senator Olympia Snowe (R – ME) as a small business that is using technology and innovative thinking to help solve our nation's energy crisis and keep Mainers warm during the lengthy winter. Senator Snowe commented that Maine Energy Systems is at the vanguard of the "green" product revolution, creating a product that is beneficial to the environment, saves consumers money, and produces profits and jobs.

Otten was a former President of the Maine Pellet Fuels Association.

FutureMetrics
Otten is an early investor in the consultancy FutureMetrics, whose team work in the wood pellet manufacturing sector.

Other ventures
Les Otten is currently involved in a number of ventures including Cartera Commerce (provides online shopping for loyalty programs) and Sports Vision Technologies (produces P3ProSwing, a golf swing analyzer and golf simulator). He is current board chairman for the Cromwell Center for Disabilities Awareness in Portland, Maine. The Center provides disabilities awareness education in schools, for prospective educators, and in workplaces.

Otten is involved in several other businesses in Maine, including the Phoenix House and Well restaurant in Newry, Colony Development Company in Bethel and Sports Vision Technologies in Bethel and Portland. Sports Vision Technologies currently employees nearly a dozen people that live in Maine.

Governor's Wood-to-Energy Task Force
In 2008, Otten was asked by Maine Governor John Baldacci to chair the Governor's Wood-to-Energy Task Force which was charged with finding ways to reduce the state's reliance on foreign oil and stimulate Maine's economy by developing renewable sources of energy made in Maine, by Maine businesses, for Maine people. The initiative sought to capitalize on opportunities to convert public buildings to wood biomass heat; encourage homeowners to switch from oil heat to heat from renewable energy sources; and, promote Maine-grown alternative energy industries.

This Wood-to-Energy Task Force reported that Maine is the most heating oil dependent state in the country with 440,000 households consuming an average of 900 gallons of heating oil a year. At a July 2008 price of $4.64 a gallon that amounts to $4,100 per Maine household. The Task Force concluded that wood-to-energy can lower the cost of home heating approximately 25 to 50% of the cost of No. 2 heating oil.

Maine Handicapped Skiing
Otten founded Maine Handicapped Skiing with Omar D. "Chip" Crothers, M.D. to ensure access to and participation in the recreational sports that are integral to a well-rounded life for every person. Maine Handicapped Skiing is the largest year-round adaptive recreation program east of the Mississippi for adults and children with physical disabilities. From Veterans No Boundaries to children with cerebral palsy, Maine Handicapped Skiing helps a wide spectrum of Mainers.  In 2013 Maine Handicapped Skiing changed its name to Maine Adaptive Sports and Recreation.

Cromwell Center for Disabilities Awareness

Otten is currently serving as chairman of the Cromwell Center for Disabilities Awareness, an organization dedicated to ensuring that people with all types of disabilities are afforded the same dignity, inclusion, and respect that every person deserves as a birthright.

Otten was honored as the Cromwell Center Person of the Year for 2009.

Western Mountains Alliance
In 1987, Otten was part of a group of civic-minded individuals from across western Maine who came together to form the Western Mountains Alliance in order to seek a sustainable development strategy for western Maine, a region struggling with long-term economic decline.
Otten acted as first chairman of the Western Mountains Alliance.

Maine Chamber Alliance
In 1990, Otten co-founded and served as the first chairman of the Economic Environmental Council of Maine, which merged with the Maine Chamber to become the Maine Chamber Alliance, where Otten also served as the first chair of that organization. The goal of these organizations was to create an environment where the needs of the paper industry could find middle ground with the environmental concerns of Maine citizens.

Portland Museum of Art
Otten is past chairman and current Board of Trustees member of the Portland Museum of Art, since the collection put together by his father, the former German steel magnate Albert Otten (in German: Albert Ottenheimer), is hosted there. Al Otten became owner of Albot Industries in New Jersey when he had to emigrate from Germany.

Project Opportunity
In 1988 Otten started Project Opportunity in Bethel by donating the initial grant and creating its goal of helping late bloomers. Project Opportunity is a unique Grant and Scholarship Program benefitting Telstar Regional High School students. From the generous donations Project Opportunity has received, students have been able to attend colleges throughout the United States as well experience educational trips throughout the World.

Political career
Otten is a former candidate for Governor of Maine in the 2010 election.

On October 19, 2009, Otten formally announced his candidacy for the Republican gubernatorial primary in the 2010 election. In his announcement speech, Otten emphasized the need for Maine to create jobs, lower taxes, prepare its students for the global economy and take control of its energy future.

On June 22, 2009, after months of speculation, word broke that Otten will announce the formation of an exploratory committee for a potential bid for Governor of Maine on June 29. Otten is running as a Republican. The campaign was criticized by the Maine Democratic Party for allegedly copying President Barack Obama's famous "O" insignia and website layout from the 2008 presidential election cycle. A statement from Otten's website claims that it was actually the Obama campaign who first "copied" the logo from the new Pepsi logo. This claim was too refuted, as the Obama "O" was first used months before Pepsi revamped their logo.

Counting among his campaign staff is Christian Potholm, a Maine political consultant that helped Democratic Governor John Baldacci defeat Republican candidate Chandler Woodcock in 2006. Potholm is Professor of Government at Bowdoin College who has authored several books on Maine politics including, Maine: The Dynamics of Political Change, This Splendid Game: Maine Campaigns and Elections, 1940–2002 and An Insider's Guide to Maine Politics:1946–1996.

William J. Ryan, Chairman, President and CEO of TD Banknorth Group, Inc. served as Treasurer of the Exploratory Committee for Otten's potential bid for Governor of Maine in 2010. After the official announcement of the formal campaign, Bruce Chalmers, President of Chalmers Insurance Group in Bridgton, Maine took over as Campaign Treasurer.

Political views 
He confirmed in 2020 that he would vote for Joe Biden, even though he is a Republican.

Balsams Resort rebuilding
On February 28, 2016, The Boston Globe reported that Otten had purchased part of the now-closed Balsams Resort in Dixville Notch, New Hampshire. According to the article, Otten plans to spend over $100 million to renovate and rebuild the resort with the goal of turning it into a four seasons destination. If finished, the skiing area would be the largest in New England, with 2,200 acres of skiiable terrain.

Personal life and family
Otten lives in Dixville Notch, New Hampshire. He raised three children.

References

External links
 Les Otten for Governor (official web site) (2009 archived copy)
 Cromwell Center for Disabilities Awareness
 Maine Energy Systems
 FutureMetrics
 The Colony Development
 Cartera Commerce
 P3ProSwing

1949 births
Living people
Boston Red Sox owners
Boston Red Sox executives
Businesspeople from Maine
Hun School of Princeton alumni
Ithaca College alumni
Maine Republicans
People from Greenwood, Maine
People from Teaneck, New Jersey